is one of the eleven wards in the city of Kyoto, in Kyoto Prefecture, Japan. First established in 1879, it has been merged and split, and took on its present boundaries in 1955, with the establishment of a separate Minami-ku.

Kyoto Tower and Kyoto Station are major landmarks in Shimogyō-ku. Shijō Street on the northern edge of the area, especially around the Shijō Kawaramachi intersection, is the busiest shopping district in the city. Kyoto Station has an extensive shopping center, including a department store in the station building, and the underground Porta mall.

Shimogyō-ku has a population of 82,784 and an area of 6.78 km². Three rivers, Horikawa, Kamogawa and Takasegawa pass through the ward.

Demographics

Economy
Omron, a global electronic components and automation manufacturer is headquartered in the ward.
 Takara Holdings, a company mainly involved in the production of beverages and medical supplies
 Tose, a video game and mobile game development company
 Bank of Kyoto, a Japanese bank based in Kyoto.

Education
 Ikenobo Junior College
 Omiya Campus of Ryukoku University
 Campus Plaza Kyoto

Lycée français international de Kyoto, a French international school, is in Shimogyô-ku.

Sights
 Nishi Honganji
 Higashi Honganji
 Kyoto Railway Museum

References

External links

  

Wards of Kyoto